The canton of Crozon is an administrative division of the Finistère department, northwestern France. Its borders were modified at the French canton reorganisation which came into effect in March 2015. Its seat is in Crozon.

It consists of the following communes:
 
Argol
Camaret-sur-Mer
Cast
Châteaulin
Crozon
Dinéault
Landévennec
Lanvéoc
Ploéven
Plomodiern
Plonévez-Porzay
Port-Launay
Quéménéven
Roscanvel
Saint-Coulitz
Saint-Nic
Telgruc-sur-Mer
Trégarvan

References

Cantons of Finistère